The siege of Donegal took place in August 1601 during the Nine Years' War in Ireland, when a Gaelic Irish army  led by Hugh Roe O'Donnell laid siege to the town of Donegal. The garrison of the town was a mixture of English troops and allied Gaelic troops led by Niall Garve O'Donnell. Heavy fighting took place during the month-long siege in which Donegal Abbey was destroyed by an accidental gunpowder explosion. Having suffered several repulses, Hugh Roe O'Donnell abandoned the siege and moved his army southwards to Munster to take part in the Battle of Kinsale. In his absence, Crown forces were able to use Donegal as a base to capture the strategic town of Ballyshannon.

Conn O'Donnell was killed during the siege, while fighting for the Crown.

References

Bibliography
 McGurk, John. Sir Henry Docwra, 1564-1631: Derry's Second Founder. Four Courts Press, 2006.

1601 in Ireland
Donegal
Donegal (town)
Donegal